Marek Dziuba (born 19 December 1955, in Łódź) is a retired Polish football player and later a football manager. He played for a few clubs, including ŁKS Łódź and Widzew Łódź.

Dziuba played for Polish national team, for which he played 53 matches and scored one goal. He was a participant at the 1982 FIFA World Cup, where Poland won the bronze medal.

He later worked as a football manager, coaching for example ŁKS Łódź and Widzew Łódź.

References

1955 births
Living people
Polish footballers
Poland international footballers
Polish football managers
Widzew Łódź managers
ŁKS Łódź managers
ŁKS Łódź players
Widzew Łódź players
1982 FIFA World Cup players
Footballers from Łódź
Association football defenders
Belgian Pro League players
Sint-Truidense V.V. players